Keldermans is a family of artists, originating from Mechelen (an independent city surrounded by the Duchy of Brabant). The members of the family were mostly architects working in the Brabantine Gothic style. As the most important architects of their time in the Netherlands, they defined the Brabantine Gothic style, and their works can still be seen today in cities like Mechelen, Brussels, Antwerp, Ghent, Lier, Middelburg and Gouda. Anthonis II and Rombout II were court architects for Charles V. Laurens II, last in the line, was influenced by Renaissance architecture and marked the end of the Gothic period in this region.

Family tree

Name
The actual family name was Van Mansdale. Keldermans (Dutch for cellar man) was a nickname given to Jan I because the family house was nicknamed  't Kelderken (the cellar). The family was not happy with the nickname and usually continued to sign documents with the name "Van Mansdale".

References

External links
Keldermans family at Archimon
Origin of the name (in Dutch)
Keldermans family at strecker.be

Gothic architects
Brabant
Belgian families